Squalius is a genus of fish in the family Cyprinidae found in Europe and Asia. Hybridization is not rare in the Cyprinidae, including this genus. S. alburnoides is known to be of ancient hybrid origin, with the paternal lineage deriving from a prehistoric species related to Anaecypris; the latter mated with ancestral S. pyrenaicus. Present-day S. alburnoides mates with sympatric congeners of other species.

Species
There are currently 52 recognized species in this genus:
 Squalius adanaensis Turan, Kottelat & Doğan, 2013 (Adana chub) 
 Squalius agdamicus S. N. Kamensky, 1901
 Squalius alburnoides (Steindachner, 1866)
 Squalius albus (Bonaparte, 1838)
 Squalius anatolicus (Bogutskaya, 1997) (Beyşehir chub) 
 Squalius aphipsi (A. I. Aleksandrov, 1927) (Aphips chub) 
 Squalius aradensis (Coelho, Bogutskaya, Rodrigues & Collares-Pereira, 1998)
 Squalius aristotelis Özuluğ & Freyhof, 2011 (Tuzla chub) 
 Squalius berak Heckel, 1843 (Mesopotamian chub) 
 Squalius cappadocicus Özuluğ & Freyhof, 2011 (Cappadocian chub) 
 Squalius carinus Özuluğ & Freyhof, 2011 (Chocolate chub) 
 Squalius carolitertii (Doadrio, 1988) 
 Squalius castellanus Doadrio, Perea & F. M. Alonso, 2007
 Squalius cephaloides (Battalgil, 1942) (Thick-lipped chub) 
 Squalius cephalus (Linnaeus, 1758) (Common chub)
 Squalius cii (J. Richardson, 1857) 
 Squalius fellowesii (Günther, 1868) (Aegean chub) 
 Squalius ghigii (Gianferrari, 1927) (Rhodes chub)
 Squalius illyricus Heckel & Kner, 1857
 Squalius janae Bogutskaya & Zupančič, 2010
 Squalius keadicus (Stephanidis, 1971) 
 Squalius kosswigi (M. S. Karaman (sr), 1972) 
 Squalius kottelati Turan, Yılmaz & Kaya, 2009 
 Squalius laietanus Doadrio, Kottelat & de Sostoa, 2007
 Squalius lepidus Heckel, 1843
 Squalius lucumonis (Bianco, 1983)
 Squalius malacitanus Doadrio & Carmona, 2006
 Squalius microlepis Heckel, 1843
 Squalius moreoticus (Stephanidis, 1971) (Stymphalia chub)
 Squalius namak Khaefi, Esmaeili, Sayyadzadeh, Geiger & Freyhof, 2016 
 Squalius orientalis (Nordmann, 1840)
 Squalius orpheus Kottelat & Economidis, 2006 (Orpheus chub)
 Squalius pamvoticus (Stephanidis, 1939) (Pamvotis chub)
 Squalius peloponensis (Valenciennes, 1844) (Peloponnese chub)
 Squalius platyceps Zupančič, Marić, Naseka & Bogutskaya, 2010
 Squalius prespensis (Fowler, 1977)
 Squalius pursakensis (Hankó (hu), 1925) (Sakarya chub) 
 Squalius pyrenaicus (Günther, 1868)
 Squalius recurvirostris Özuluğ & Freyhof, 2011 (Akşehir chub) 
 Squalius seyhanensis Turan, Kottelat & Doğan, 2013 (Seyhan chub) 
 Squalius spurius Heckel, 1843 (Orontes chub)
 Squalius squaliusculus Kessler, 1872  (Syr-Darya dace)
 Squalius squalus (Bonaparte, 1837)
 Squalius svallize Heckel & Kner, 1857
 Squalius tenellus Heckel, 1843
 Squalius torgalensis (Coelho, Bogutskaya, Rodrigues & Collares-Pereira, 1998)
 Squalius turcicus De Filippi, 1865 (Transcaucasian chub)
 Squalius ulanus Günther, 1899
 Squalius valentinus Doadrio & Carmona, 2006
 Squalius vardarensis S. L. Karaman, 1928
 Squalius zrmanjae S. L. Karaman, 1928

References

 
Cyprinidae genera
Taxa named by Charles Lucien Bonaparte
Taxonomy articles created by Polbot